Rebecca Field Jones (1905–2002) was an American artist who worked for the Works Progress Administration (WPA) and went on to found the West Hartford Art League.

Biography

Jones née Field was born in Montague, Massachusetts on March 13, 1905. She briefly attended Massachusetts Agricultural College (now the University of Massachusetts Amherst) and the Massachusetts Art School before studying in art in Munich, Germany. In 1934 she cofounded the West Hartford Art League along with Getrude Patterson Bezanker. The organization was located in red brick schoolhouse at 87 Mountain Road. From 1935 through 1938 she worked for the Public Works of Art Project and its successor, the Federal Arts Project. She then worked for the Public Works Administration's drafting department.

In 1941 she married fellow artist Frederic Edward Jones. She taught at the West Hartford Art League, Miss Porter's School, and the Oxford School. She was a member of the Hartford Society of Women Painters. In the 1970s Jones relocated to New Hampshire. She died on April 16, 2002 in Windsor, Vermont.

References

External links
 Rebecca Field Jones Images posted by the Connecticut State Library on Flickr 
 

1905 births
2002 deaths
American women artists
Federal Art Project artists